The 2014 Hockenheimring GP3 Series round was a GP3 Series motor race held on July 19 and 20, 2014 at Hockenheimring in Hockenheim, Germany. It was the fourth round of the 2014 GP3 Season. The race weekend supported the 2014 German Grand Prix.

Classification

Qualifying

Feature race

See also 
 2014 German Grand Prix
 2014 Hockenheimring GP2 Series round

References

External links
 

Hockenheim
GP3